Allan Gray (born 12 December 1943) was a Scottish amateur footballer who played as a centre half in the Scottish League for Clyde and Queen's Park. He was capped by Scotland at amateur level.

References

Scottish footballers
Scottish Football League players
Queen's Park F.C. players
Association football wing halves
Scotland amateur international footballers
Place of birth missing (living people)
Clyde F.C. players
Drumchapel Amateur F.C. players
1943 births
Living people